The Air Force Interoperability Council (AFIC), also known as the Air and Space Interoperability Council (ASIC), is an organisation tasked with enhancing coalition military aviation amongst the "Five Eyes" countries, which consist of Australia, Canada, New Zealand, the United Kingdom and United States. AFIC has a permanent management committee based in Washington DC.

The organization focuses on improved war-fighting capabilities, by maximizing interoperability, such as the capability for particular aircraft types to be cross-serviced. AFIC's primary publication outputs are Air Standards, Advisory Publications and Information Publications, which seek to increase operational effectiveness by describing common technical specifications, interoperability objectives and/or Tactics, Techniques and Procedures (TTP).

History 
In 1942, Captain Frank T. McCoy, a USAAF intelligence officer attached to Technical Air Intelligence Unit–South West Pacific, invented a  system of reporting names for Japanese aircraft, to improve and speed-up secure communications and intelligence-sharing. The system was eventually adopted by the Western Allied air forces throughout Asia and the Pacific.

Following the end of World War II, the Air Standards Coordination Committee (ASCC) was formed in 1948 by the air force chiefs of staff of Canada, the United Kingdom and the United States. ASCC was expanded to include the US Navy in 1951, the RAAF in 1964 and RNZAF in 1965. 

During the Cold War, the most prominent task assigned to ASCC was the creation of reporting names – sometimes known, erroneously, as "NATO reporting names" – for aircraft originating in the Soviet Union, other Warsaw Pact countries and the  People's Republic of China.

An external review of the ASCC was undertaken in 2004 to examine the organisational processes and structures. As a result of this review in 2005 the ASCC was restructured, downsized and renamed Air and Space Interoperability Council (ASIC).

In 2016, the Air Chiefs of the Five Eyes nations recommended that in order to increase ASIC’s operational relevance. As a result, in 2017 ASIC reviewed and amended its operating concepts and procedures, refocused its activities to concentrate on interoperability, and changed its name to Air Force Interoperability Council. AFIC consists of representatives from the Royal Air Force (RAF), Royal Australian Air Force (RAAF), Royal Canadian Air Force (RCAF), Royal New Zealand Air Force (RNZAF), United States Air Force (USAF) and the United States Navy (USN).

Related organisations 
AFIC maintains links with other combined interoperability bodies – harmonizing activities and working in collaboration on major projects. These include:
 NATO – as Canada, the UK and US also belong to NATO, cross functional networking with this organisation is ongoing.
 ANZUS – NATO equivalent linking Australia, New Zealand and the US.
 ABCANZ Armies Program (land forces equivalent)
 AUSCANNZUKUS (naval equivalent)
 Combined Communications Electronics Board (military communications equivalent)
 Five Eyes – equivalent signals intelligence network
 The Technical Cooperation Program (equivalent in military technology and science)

See also 
CANZUK (proposed formal alliance)
AUKUS (submarine engineering/technology agreement)
UKUSA Agreement (signals intelligence)

Notes and references

External links 
 http://www.aerospaceweb.org/question/history/q0070.shtml - Soviet aircraft codenames

Anglosphere
Space science organizations
Royal Air Force
Royal Australian Air Force
Royal Canadian Air Force
Royal New Zealand Air Force
United States Air Force
Military standardization